Alison Peebles (born 1953) is a Scottish actress, director, and writer in theatre, film, and television. She is a co-founder of Communicado, a Scottish theatre company.

Early life
Peebles trained as a Painter at Edinburgh College of Art.

Career
In 1983, she he co-founded Communicado, a Scottish theatre company, with Gerry Mulgrew and Rob Pickavance.

Peebles portrayed Lady Macbeth in Michael Boyd's celebrated 1993 production of Macbeth at The Tron Theatre in Glasgow, Scotland.
 
She directed the film AfterLife, which won the Standard Life Audience Award at the Edinburgh International Film Festival in 2003.

Personal life
Peebles appeared in the documentary Multiple, shown on BBC Scotland in February 2006, in which she revealed that she has multiple sclerosis. Her Molly and Mack character, Mrs. Juniper, has been shown to use a crutch to get around.

Awards and honours
In 2016, Peebles was nominated for the Best Supporting Actress at the 2016 BAFTA Scotland Film Awards.

Filmography

Actress

 2018–2019 Molly and Mack (children's TV series)
 2018–2019 River City
 2015 Where Do We Go From Here?
 2011 Fast Romance (film)
 2010 Lip Service (TV series) 
 2010 Labour (film short) 
 2009 Floating Is Easy (short) 
 2009 Wasted (film)
 2009 Eadar-Chluich (TV series) 
 2004–2008 High Times (TV series) 
 2008 Trouble Sleeping 
 2007 Silver Tongues (short) 
 1988–2005 Taggart (TV series) 
 2004 Sex Traffic (TV movie) 
 2003 AfterLife (film) 
 2003 Skagerrak (film) 
 1999 Psychos (TV mini-series) 
 1998 The Acid House (film)
 1997 Bumping the Odds (TV movie) 
 1996 Rab C. Nesbitt (TV series) 
 1995 The Final Cut (TV mini-series) 
 1992–1993 Strathblair (TV series) 
 1992 Bunch of Five (TV series) 
 1991–1992 The Advocates (TV series) 
 1990 Casualty (TV series)

Director
 2003 AfterLife (film)
 2002-2003 Stacey Stone (TV series) 
 2001 Tangerine (film short) 
 2001 Nan (film short)

Radio

Awards

References

External links
 
 

Scottish women film directors
Scottish stage actresses
Scottish television actresses
Scottish radio actresses
People with multiple sclerosis
Living people
1953 births
Scottish screenwriters
British women screenwriters
20th-century Scottish actresses
21st-century Scottish actresses
Alumni of the Edinburgh College of Art